The 2017 888sport European Masters was a professional ranking snooker tournament that took place from 2–8 October 2017 in Lommel, Belgium. It was the sixth ranking event of the 2017/2018 season. It was the first full ranking event to be held in Belgium since the European Open was played in Antwerp in 1994.

Qualifying took place from 3–4 August in Preston.

Judd Trump was the defending champion, having beaten Ronnie O'Sullivan 9–8 in the 2016 final in Bucharest, Romania. He successfully defended the title, defeating Stuart Bingham 9–7 in this year's final.

Prize fund
The breakdown of prize money for this year is shown below:

 Winner: £75,000
 Runner-up: £35,000
 Semi-final: £17,500
 Quarter-final: £11,000
 Last 16: £6,000
 Last 32: £4,000
 Last 64: £2,000

 Televised highest break: £1,500
 Total: £366,500

The "rolling 147 prize" for a maximum break stood at £35,000

Main draw

Final

Qualifying
These matches were held between 3 and 4 August 2017 at the Preston Guild Hall in Preston, England. All matches were best of 7 frames.

Notes

Century breaks

Qualifying stage centuries

Total: 19

 140  Eden Sharav
 130  Jimmy Robertson
 130  Noppon Saengkham
 127, 100  Robert Milkins
 119  Anthony Hamilton
 118  Jack Lisowski
 116  Zhou Yuelong
 112  Ben Woollaston
 111  Martin Gould

 110  Thor Chuan Leong
 107  Michael Georgiou
 106  Neil Robertson
 105  Mark Davis
 105  Andrew Higginson
 103  Ryan Day
 102  Joe Perry
 101  Cao Yupeng
 100  Matthew Selt

Televised stage centuries

Total: 52

 145, 141, 110, 102  Mark Allen
 143  Martin Gould
 138, 138, 136, 112, 101  Zhou Yuelong
 134, 129, 100  Neil Robertson
 131, 127, 120, 116, 111, 109  Mark Selby
 131, 109  John Higgins
 130, 119, 116, 113, 107, 102, 101  Stuart Bingham
 129  Aditya Mehta
 127  Jack Lisowski
 121, 116  Ben Woollaston

 115, 110, 107, 107, 106, 101, 100  Judd Trump
 113  Alfie Burden
 109  Jamie Jones
 108  Mei Xiwen
 105, 102, 101, 100  David Gilbert
 105  Martin O'Donnell
 103  Mark Davis
 102, 102, 101  Mark Williams
 102  Thepchaiya Un-Nooh

References

External links

2017
European Masters
European Masters
Snooker in Belgium
Lommel
European Masters